The Church of the Good Thief is the third and final release from Andy Hull's solo project, Right Away, Great Captain!, which follows the journey of a 17th-century sailor. From Right Away, Great Captain!'s  Myspace blog: "The third story/album starts with our hero laying over Anna's lover (and hero's brother). The brother has been killed. His wife has seen what the children saw and we spend a lot of time inside our hero's mind and the reality that he is indeed a murderer of his own flesh and blood."  The album was released on June 12, 2012.

Track listing 
 "Blame" - 3:46	
 "When I Met Death" - 2:58	
 "I Am Aware" - 3:10	
 "Old Again" - 2:58	
 "Fur Stop Caring" - 2:57	
 "I Wait For You" - 4:48	
 "Barely Bit Me" - 3:00	
 "Rotten Black Root" - 3:31	
 "We Were Made Out Of Lightning" - 4:24	
 "Memories From The End Pt. 1" - 3:40	
 "Memories From The End Pt. 2" - 3:28

References 

2012 albums
Right Away, Great Captain! albums